Ononis arvensis, the field restharrow, is a widespread species of flowering plant in the family Fabaceae, native to Eurasia from central Europe through to western Siberia and the western Himalayas.

References

arvensis
Flora of Norway
Flora of Sweden
Flora of Finland
Flora of Denmark
Flora of Central Europe
Flora of Southeastern Europe
Flora of Eastern Europe
Flora of Turkey
Flora of the Caucasus
Flora of Iran
Flora of Kazakhstan
Flora of Kyrgyzstan
Flora of Tajikistan
Flora of West Siberia
Flora of Altai (region)
Flora of Pakistan
Flora of West Himalaya
Flora of Xinjiang
Flora of Tibet
Plants described in 1759
Taxa named by Carl Linnaeus